Most of My Heroes Still Don't Appear on No Stamp is the eleventh studio album by American hip hop group Public Enemy, released on July 13, 2012, by Slam Jamz. It was sold exclusively at the iTunes Store before its release to other retailers. It was released on CD on November 6. The album is the first of two albums that Public Enemy released in 2012, which Chuck D described as "fraternal twins", along with The Evil Empire of Everything, which was released on October 1, 2012. The album features guest vocals from Brother Ali, Bumpy Knuckles, Cormega, and DMC. The title track "Most of My Heroes Still..." was produced and co-written by Z-Trip.

Upon its release, Most of My Heroes Still Don't Appear on No Stamp received positive reviews from music critics, who complimented its production and found its political lyrics relevant to contemporary times.

The name of the album comes from the line "most of my heroes don't appear on no stamp", from "Fight the Power".

Critical reception 

Most of My Heroes Still Don't Appear on No Stamp received generally positive reviews from music critics. Allmusic editor Stephen Thomas Erlewine gave it four out of five stars and commended Public Enemy for "remain[ing] true to the sounds and sensibilities they laid out back in the late '80s", writing that "the music remains vital and vibrant, possibly because, despite some progress, things still haven't changed all that much and, in some respects, have gotten worse...and as long as Public Enemy's heroes remain consigned to the margins, they'll still make music as dynamic as this." Ray Rahman of Entertainment Weekly complimented its production, particularly the "newer, weirder, and welcome musical elements" on certain tracks, and called the album "pretty damn great."

Consequence of Sound's Matt Melis gave the album three stars and felt that "a few cuts [are] completely out of left field", writing that "most of this record falls into tried-and-true PE formulas, but there's no dust or rust to be found on the album's top tracks." MSN Music's Robert Christgau gave it an "A−", indicating "the kind of garden-variety good record that is the great luxury of musical micromarketing and overproduction. Anyone open to its aesthetic will enjoy more than half its tracks." Christgau found it "pretty damn good" and felt that "preacher Chuck needs William Drayton's nuttiness no matter how corrupt it's become, in part because its corruption is a corrective to all of Chuck's conceptualizing." He criticized that, although the album's "young beatmakers echo the old Bomb Squad whomp, the preacher has lost some boom vocally, and like his cadences, the politics are old-school", but "the times justify those old politics more than ever."

Track listing

Personnel 
Credits adapted from Allmusic.

 Jamod Allah - Vocals
 B. Dixon - Composer
 Harry Belafonte - Inspiration
 Brother Ali - Featured Artist
 Brother Mike - Unknown Contributor Role
 Bumpy Knuckles - Featured Artist
 Triniti Coclough - Producer, Vocal Producer, Vocal Recording
 Cormega - Featured Artist
 Chuck D - Group Member, Liner Notes
 Davy DMX - Bass
 Eva Rose Demeno - Vocals
 Brent Dixon - Producer
 DJ C-Double - Scratching
 DJ Johnny 'Juice' Rosado - Producer
 DJ Lord - Composer, Group Member, Scratching
 DJ Pain 1 - Producer, Scratching
 Dj Rob Swift - Scratching
 DMC - Featured Artist
 Spent Dnero -  Engineer, Mixing
 William Drayton - Executive Producer
 The Enemyboard Vetz - Vocals
 Flavor Flav - Group Member
 Kelvin Fonville - Cover Design
 Freddy Fox - Composer, Mixing, Producer
 Gary G-Wiz -  Executive Producer, Producer, Vocal Producer, Vocal Recording
 Piero F. Giunti - Photography
 Micheal Gregoire - Package Design
 Tim Hans - Photography
 James Bomb -  Producer, Spoken Word, Unknown Contributor Role
 DJ Johnny Juice - Scratching
 Large Professor - Featured Artist, Producer
 Peter Levin - Claves, Fender Rhodes, Organ
 Paul Logus - Mastering

 Lord Grunge - Vocals
 Lord Kel - Vocals
 Fran Lover - Scratching
 Donald Malloy - Musician
 Jason McClain - Guitar, Mixing
 Jason McLain - Mixing
 Mr. Payback - Instrumentation, Producer
 Chris "Spanky" Moss - Producer
 Buddah Munroe - Mixing
 A. Newman - Composer
 Pop Diesel S1W - Unknown Contributor Role
 Professor Griff - Arranger, Group Member, Producer
 Public Enemy - Primary Artist
 G. Rinaldo - Composer
 Paul Robeson - Inspiration
 Johnny Juice Rosado -  Arranger, Editing, Engineer, Mixing, Producer, Vocal Producer, Vocal Recording
 Clint Sands - Engineer, Mixing
 Clint "Mister Payback" Sands - Producer
 Z. Sciacca - Composer
 Sam Sever - Arranger, Composer, Mixing, Original Recording Producer, Producer, Scratching, Sounds
 Amani K. Smith - Engineer, Mixing
 Spook 1 - Vocals
 T-Bone Motta - Drums
 Ras Truly - Engineer, Mixing
 Gebre Waddell - Tracking
 Anthony Ware - Musician
 Daniel Ware - Musician
 Jonathon Ware - Musician
 David Wong - Photography
 Khari Wynn - Guitar
 Z-Trip -  Featured Artist, Producer, Scratching

References

External links 
 

2012 albums
Albums produced by Large Professor
Public Enemy (band) albums